Wenche Wensberg is a Norwegian handball player. She played 50 matches for the Norway women's national handball team between 1973 and 1977. She participated at the 1973 and 1975 World Women's Handball Championship.

References

Year of birth missing (living people)
Possibly living people
Norwegian female handball players